The Norton–Polk–Mathis House, also known Villa Finale, is a historic house in San Antonio, Texas, United States.

Local merchant Russel C. Norton began construction on the house in 1876. The house was designated a Recorded Texas Historic Landmark in 1971.

It is a contributing property to the King William Historic District, which is listed on the National Register of Historic Places. It is also a National Trust Historic Site, the only one in Texas.

The house was remodeled with additions of a second story, rear gallery, and Italian Renaissance Revival Tower. Other owners included rancher Edwin Polk and cattleman Ike T. Pryor. The house was then turned into a boarding house until 1967, when it was purchased by local civic leader Walter Nold Mathis.

Mathis spent two years restoring the house and named it Villa Finale as he planned on it being his last home. He then purchased fourteen other homes in the King William neighborhood, restored them and sold them to others whom he hoped would continue to preserve them. The home was donated to the National Trust for Historic Preservation in 2004 which operates it as a museum.

See also

National Register of Historic Places listings in Bexar County, Texas
Recorded Texas Historic Landmarks in Bexar County

References

External links

National Trust for Historic Preservation

Recorded Texas Historic Landmarks
Houses on the National Register of Historic Places in Texas
Museums in San Antonio
Historic house museums in Texas
Houses in San Antonio
Italianate architecture in Texas
Villas in the United States
Historic district contributing properties in Texas
National Trust for Historic Preservation
National Register of Historic Places in San Antonio